Qingzhou is a town in Qing County, Hebei, China.

Township-level divisions of Hebei
Qing County